Andorra men's national pitch and putt team represents Andorra in the pitch and putt international competitions. It is managed by the Associació Andorrana de Pitch and Putt, established in 2007.

Pitch and putt in Andorra is played in two courses, "El Torrent" and "Vall d'Ordino".

Andorra were the runners-up in the 2006 Pitch and putt World Cup, and reached the fifth place in the 2007 and 2010 European Championships.

National team

Players
National team in the European Championship 2010
Pepe Garcia
Guillem Escabrós
Pau Perez
Ivan Sanz
Toni Armengol
Joan Carles Busquet

National team in the World Cup 2008
 Antoni Armengol
 Guillem Escabrós
 Josep Escabrós

National team in the European Championship 2007
Antoni Armengol
Marc Armengol
Guillem Escabrós
Ivan Sanz
Ferran da Silca
Francesc Gaset

See also
World Cup Team Championship

External links
World Cup 2006

National pitch and putt teams
Pitch and putt